Keijo Liinamaa's cabinet was the 57th government of Finland. The cabinet existed for 171 days, lasting from 13 June 1975 to 30 November 1975. The Liinamaa cabinet was a caretaker government (Finnish: virkamieshallitus) drawn by President Urho Kekkonen. Due to this government having been instituted by the President, the government included no politically affiliated parties, consisting instead only of government employees. The cabinet’s Prime Minister was Keijo Liinamaa.

Ministers

References 

Liinamaa
1975 establishments in Finland
1975 disestablishments in Finland
Cabinets established in 1975
Cabinets disestablished in 1975